The Logan Elm that stood near Circleville in Pickaway County, Ohio, was one of the largest American elm trees (Ulmus americana) recorded. Weakened by Dutch elm disease, the tree died from storm damage in 1964. The Logan Elm State Memorial commemorates the site and preserves various associated markers and monuments.

According to tradition, Chief Logan of the Mingo tribe delivered a passionate speech at a peace-treaty meeting under this elm in 1774,  said to be the most famous speech ever given by a Native American, now known as "Logan's Lament":

I appeal to any white man to say, if ever he entered Logan's cabin hungry, and he gave him not meat; if ever he came cold and naked, and he clothed him not. During the course of the last long and bloody war, Logan remained idle in his cabin, an advocate for peace. Such was my love for the whites, that my countrymen pointed as they passed, and said, Logan is the friend of the white men. I have even thought to live with you but for the injuries of one man. Col. Cresap, the last spring, in cold blood, and unprovoked, murdered all the relations of Logan, not sparing even my women and children.  There runs not a drop of my blood in the veins of any living creature. This has called on me for revenge. I have sought it: I have killed many: I have fully glutted my vengeance. For my country, I rejoice at the beams of peace.  But do not harbour a thought that mine is the joy of fear. Logan never felt fear. He will not turn on his heel to save his life. Who is there to mourn for Logan? Not one.

The village of Logan Elm and the Logan Elm High School are located nearby.

The 29th annual celebration of the Logan Elm was held on October 5, 1941.  Among those in attendance was poet, Frank Grubbs, who recited the poem that he wrote for the occasion. He is referred to in the article as the poet laureate of Ohio.

See also
 List of elm trees
 List of individual trees

References

1960s individual tree deaths
Individual elm trees
Individual trees in Ohio
Pickaway County, Ohio